Comanche Feats of Horsemanship is a 1834-5 Oil on canvas painting by artist George Catlin. It depicts a young man from the Comanche Nation utilizing a war on horseback technique, where he can flexibly drop his body to the side of the horse while riding it, effectively dodging enemies.

Catlin described the technique in his letters and sketches in 1834, while accompanied United States Dragoons in Indian Territory:

Popular Culture 
The painting is prominently featured in the second episode of 2019 HBO show Watchmen, the sequel to the graphic novel of the same name. The episode, Martial Feats of Comanche Horsemanship derives its name from the painting.

In the show, it hangs prominently in the house of Tulsa chief of police, Judd Crawford (played by Don Johnson).

According to the annotated notes of the show, displayed in HBO's website, and written in-universe by FBI Agent Dale Petey (played by Dustin Ingram), the painting was given to Crawford by Senator Joe Keene, who wrote the Keene Act, which banned costumed vigilantes except when sanctioned by the U.S. government, setting forth the events of the graphic novel.

References 

Paintings in the collection of the Smithsonian American Art Museum
Paintings by George Catlin
1834 paintings
1835 paintings
War paintings